Končulj is a village located in the municipality of Bujanovac, Serbia. According to the 2002 census, the village has a population of 1,306 people, entirely composed of ethnic Albanians. There is border crossing between Serbia and Kosovo near Končulj.

Preševo Valley Insurgency and Končulj agreement 

During the Insurgency in the Preševo Valley, the UCPMB was founded in Dobrošin. The UCPMB attacked until the border with Macedonia and continued up until the end of the eastern Serbia-Kosovo border. Končulj was one of the first villages attacked by the UCPMB and was occupied until the of the Insurgency in the Preševo Valley. 

In 2001 it was liberated and on 20 May, 2001, the Končulj agreement was signed between Shefket Musilu, Mustafa Saqiri, Ridvan Qazimi "Lleshi", and Muhamet Xhemajli. The agreement was witnessed by Sean Sullivan, who was the NATO Head of Office in the FRY.

References

Populated places in Pčinja District
Kosovo–Serbia border crossings
Albanian communities in Serbia